UNTV is one of the television networks in the Philippines.

UNTV may also refer to:
 UN Web TV, formerly known as United Nations Television
 DWAO-TV, the flagship station of UNTV